Michael Sievert is an American business executive, currently the president and CEO of T-Mobile US, and a member of the company's board of directors. In November 2019, T-Mobile announced that Sievert would be promoted from chief operating officer (COO) to CEO in May 2020 when John Legere stepped down. Sievert took control a month earlier than planned, on April 1, 2020, the same day T-Mobile closed its merger with Sprint.

Early life and education 
Sievert was born in Canton, Ohio. At age 10, he became a paper carrier for The Repository, using his earnings to buy a Radio Shack TRS-80 and, later, a Commodore 64. He graduated from GlenOak High School in 1987 and received a bachelor's degree in economics from the Wharton School of the University of Pennsylvania in 1991.

Career
Sievert started his career at Procter & Gamble, where he oversaw brands such as Pepto-Bismol and Crest. He subsequently worked at IBM and Clearwire. He was also executive vice president (EVP) and chief global marketing and sales officer at E-Trade and CEO of tablet gaming company Discovery Bay Games. From 2002 to 2005, Sievert was EVP and CMO of AT&T Wireless. He joined Microsoft's Global Windows Group as corporate vice president of product management in 2005, leading preparations for the release of Longhorn (later called Windows Vista). In 2008 he co-founded Switchbox Labs, a startup acquired by Lenovo in 2009. In 2012, John Legere, T-Mobile's then-new CEO, hired Sievert as CMO.

Sievert became COO of T-Mobile in 2015, then became the company's president in 2018. During this time, Sievert oversaw the "Un-carrier" marketing campaign, which sought to rebrand T-Mobile's public image with a focus on no overage charges, no contracts, unlimited data, and other offerings. In April 2020, Sievert succeeded Legere as CEO of T-Mobile. Under Sievert's leadership, T-Mobile overtook AT&T in total customers to become the #2 wireless provider in the U.S. (behind Verizon), surpassed 100 million total customers, and created the first nationwide standalone 5G network in the U.S. Sievert has declared his strategy of focusing on dominating in 5G, saying “We’re making the rules for the 5G era because we’re way ahead — and I mean miles ahead."

In October 2017, he joined the board of Canadian company Shaw Communications.

Political issues
In June 2020, Sievert decided to pull all T-Mobile advertisements from Tucker Carlson Tonight because of rhetoric that criticized the Black Lives Matter movement. When announcing the move, Sievert tweeted, "Bye-bye, Tucker Carlson!" Sievert also published an open letter about T-Mobile's diversity, equity and inclusion programs.

Personal life 
Sievert has a private pilot's license and flies a seaplane as a hobby.

References

External links

American business executives
Deutsche Telekom
People from Canton, Ohio
American technology chief executives
Living people
Wharton School of the University of Pennsylvania alumni
1969 births